Boulcott is a central suburb of Lower Hutt City situated in the south of the North Island of New Zealand. The suburb lies about a kilometre north-east of the Lower Hutt CBD.

Boulcott takes its name from Almon Boulcott (1815-1880), who farmed in the area in the 1840s. His father, John Ellerker Boulcott (1784-1855), was a director of the New Zealand Company.
Armed conflict took place in the area at Boulcott's Farm in 1846 during the Hutt Valley Campaign.

Two Lower Hutt hospitals; Hutt Hospital and Boulcott Hospital, lie in Boulcott.

Demographics

Boulcott had a population of 2,613 at the 2018 New Zealand census, an increase of 126 people (5.1%) since the 2013 census, and an increase of 162 people (6.6%) since the 2006 census. There were 936 households. There were 1,236 males and 1,377 females, giving a sex ratio of 0.9 males per female. The median age was 40.6 years (compared with 37.4 years nationally), with 447 people (17.1%) aged under 15 years, 471 (18.0%) aged 15 to 29, 1,245 (47.6%) aged 30 to 64, and 453 (17.3%) aged 65 or older.

Ethnicities were 71.8% European/Pākehā, 8.8% Māori, 5.5% Pacific peoples, 21.8% Asian, and 2.3% other ethnicities (totals add to more than 100% since people could identify with multiple ethnicities).

The proportion of people born overseas was 27.2%, compared with 27.1% nationally.

Although some people objected to giving their religion, 44.1% had no religion, 41.7% were Christian, 4.8% were Hindu, 0.9% were Muslim, 1.4% were Buddhist and 1.6% had other religions.

Of those at least 15 years old, 639 (29.5%) people had a bachelor or higher degree, and 324 (15.0%) people had no formal qualifications. The median income was $36,800, compared with $31,800 nationally. The employment status of those at least 15 was that 1,101 (50.8%) people were employed full-time, 300 (13.9%) were part-time, and 96 (4.4%) were unemployed.

Education
Boulcott has two schools:

 Boulcott School, a state contributing primary (Year 1–6) school. It has  students as of 
 St Oran's College, a state-integrated Presbyterian girls' Year 7–13 secondary school. It has  students as of 

The nearest state intermediate (Year 7 and 8) schools are Naenae Intermediate School in Avalon to the north-east or Hutt Intermediate School in Woburn to the south. The nearest state secondary (Year 9–13) school is Naenae College in Avalon.

References

Suburbs of Lower Hutt
Populated places on Te Awa Kairangi / Hutt River